Tavascan - Pleta del Prat is a ski resort located around the refuge of la Pleta del Prat in the Mascarida valley. It is placed in the town of Tavascan, in the municipality of Lladorre, Catalonia. The station opened in 1991.

External links
Official website

Ski areas and resorts in Catalonia